Unity Christian High School is a private Christian school located in Hudsonville, Michigan. It is a member of Christian Schools International.

Unity Christian had approximately 674 students for the 2021–2022 school year. Unity offers several Advanced Placement courses.  The school also supports a band as well as an orchestra program, both of which have been successful at state band and orchestra festival.

Academics
Unity offers over 100 courses including 9 Advanced Placement classes, as well as Careerline Tech Center courses.  The A.P. classes that Unity offers are: Spanish Language, English Language, English Literature, Calculus, Statistics, Physics, Music Theory, U.S History and U.S Government. Traditional classes are graded on the 4 point GPA scale, while A.P. classes are weighted to a 5-point scale.
 The school operates with semesters as opposed to trimesters or quarters.

Athletics
Unity Christian High School is a member of the Michigan High School Athletic Association (MHSAA) and the Michigan Interscholastic Horsemanship Association (MIHA), and competes in the Ottawa-Kent Conference Green Division. The school offers 13 varsity sports for boys and 11 for girls. Boys are offered soccer, football, baseball, basketball, bowling, tennis, track and field, cross country, golf, wrestling, swimming, ice hockey (cooperative team with Hudsonville High School), and lacrosse (cooperative team with Holland Christian High School). Girls are offered soccer, softball, basketball, bowling, golf, track and field, cross country, tennis, volleyball, and swimming. A co-ed equestrian team is offered as well. Unity Christian's equestrian, bowling, softball, and track and field teams have also been successful in state competitions.

The Crusader varsity girls' soccer team had a 98 game unbeaten streak from 2005-2008. The school's American football team entered the MHSAA playoffs in 2007 for the first time. In 2008, the football team lost a first round playoff game to the eventual state champion, Holland Christian. In 2018 the football team won the Division 5 state championship. In 2021, the football team set a new single season state scoring record on their way to the state finals.

MHSAA State Championships

 1973 Girls Basketball - Class B
 1992 Softball - Class B
 1994 Equestrian - B Division (MIHA)
 1998 Equestrian - B Division (MIHA)
 2004 Boys Bowling - Class B
 2005 Girls Soccer - Division 3
 2006 Girls Soccer - Division 3
 2006 Girls Basketball - Class B
 2007 Girls Soccer - Division 3
 2007 Boys Soccer -  Division 2
 2008 Girls Soccer - Division 3
 2009 Girls Soccer - Division 3
 2009 Boys Soccer - Division 2
 2010 Girls Soccer - Division 3
 2012 Girls Soccer - Division 3
 2012 Boys Soccer - Division 2
 2014 Boys Soccer - Division 3
 2014 Girls Soccer - Division 3
 2015 Girls Soccer - Division 3
 2016 Girls Soccer - Division 3
 2018 Boys Soccer - Division 3
 2018 Football - Division 5
 2019 Boys Basketball - Division 2
 2022 Vex Robotics

Notable alumni
 Bethany Balcer, soccer player
 Laura Heyboer, soccer player

References

External links
 UnityChristian.org Official Site

Christian schools in Michigan
Private high schools in Michigan
Schools in Ottawa County, Michigan